Dotty Doll (born July 20, 1936, Chicago, Illinois) is an American politician who was elected to the Missouri House of Representatives.  She was first elected to the Missouri House of Representatives in 1974, representing the 29th Missouri house district. Doll was educated at the Chicago Teachers College and the University of Missouri-Kansas City.

References

1936 births
Politicians from Kansas City, Missouri
Women state legislators in Missouri
Democratic Party members of the Missouri House of Representatives
Living people